Qualtrough is a surname. Notable people with the surname include:

Carla Qualtrough (born 1971), Canadian politician and swimmer
Joseph Davidson Qualtrough (1885–1960), Manx politician

Fictional characters
Bernard Qualtrough, a spy on the television drama Spooks

Other
R M Qualtrough, assumed name of a telephone caller to William Herbert Wallace